Ministry of Communications is a Central ministry under the Government of India responsible for telecommunications and postal service. It was carved out of Ministry of Communications and Information Technology on 19 July 2016. It consists of two departments viz. Department of Telecommunications and the Department of Posts.

Formation
Ministry of Communication and Information Technology was bifurcated into Ministry of Communications and Ministry of Electronics and Information Technology.

Department of Telecommunications 

Also known as the Door Sanchar Vibhag, this department concerns itself with policy, licensing and coordination matters relating to telegraphs, telephones, wireless, data, facsimile and telematic services and other like forms of communications. It also looks into the administration of laws with respect to any of the matters specified, namely:
The Indian Telegraph Act, 1885 (13 of 1885)
The Indian Wireless Telegraphy Act, 1940 (17 of 1933)
The Telecom Regulatory Authority of India Act, 1997 (24 of 1997)

Central Public Sector Undertakings
Bharat Sanchar Nigam Limited
Indian Telephone Industries Limited
Bharat Broadband Network
Telecommunications Consultants India Limited

R&D unit

Centre for Development of Telematics

Specialised units
Wireless Planning and Coordination Wing
Telecom Engineering Center
Controller of Communication Accounts
Telecom Enforcement Resource and Monitoring (TERM) cells, formerly known as Vigilance & Telecom Monitoring (VTM) cells
A need was felt in the year 2007 to distinctly address the issues of Communication Network Security at DOT (HQ) level, consequent to enhancement of FDI limit in Telecom sector from 49% to 74% and therefore a new wing, named Security was created in DOT (HQ).

Objectives
e-Government: Providing e-infrastructure for delivery of e-services
e-Industry: Promotion of electronics hardware manufacturing and IT-ITeS industry
e-Innovation / R&D: Implementation of R&D Framework - Enabling creation of Innovation/ R&D Infrastructure in emerging areas of ICT&E/Establishment of mechanism for R&D translation
e-Learning: Providing support for development of e-Skills and Knowledge network
e-Security: Securing India's cyber space
e-Inclusion: Promoting the use of ICT for more inclusive growth
Internet Governance: Enhancing India's role in Global Platforms of Internet Governance.

Telephone Advisory Committees

Telephone Advisory Committees
MTNL Website list of TAC members
 National Institute of Electronics and Information Technology
 National Institute of Communication Finance
 National Agriculture Education Institute of Research & Resources India

Department of Posts 

The Department of Post (DoP) which wholly owns the India Post operates one of the oldest and most extensive mail services in the world. , the Indian Postal Service has  154,965 post offices, of which 139,067 (89.74%) are in rural areas and 15,898 (10.26%) are in urban areas. It has 25,585 departmental PO s and 129,380 ED BPOs. At the time of independence, there were 23,344 post offices, which were primarily in urban areas. Thus the network has registered a sevenfold growth since independence, with the focus of the expansion primarily in rural areas. On average, a post office serves an area of 21.56 sq; km and a population of 7,753 people. This is the most widely distributed post office system in the world. The large numbers are a result of a long tradition of many disparate postal systems which were unified in the Indian Union post-Independence. Owing to this far-flung reach and its presence in remote areas, the Indian postal service is also involved in other services such as small savings banking and financial services., with about 25,464 full-time and 139,040 part-time post offices. It offers a whole range of products under posts, remittance, savings, insurance, and philately. While the Director-General is the head of operations, the Secretary is an adviser to the Minister. Both responsibilities are undertaken by one officer.

The DG is assisted by the Postal Services Board with six members: The six members of the Board hold portfolios of Personnel, Operations, Technology, Postal Life Insurance, Banking, Planning respectively. Shri Ananta Narayan Nanda is the Secretary (Posts)  also the Chairman of the Postal Services Board and Ms.Meera Handa is Director General (DG) Posts. Shri.Vineet Pandey(Additional Charge) Additional Director General(Coordination) (ADG), Ms. Arundhaty Ghosh, Member (Operations), Shri. Biswanath Tripathy, Member (Planning), Shri Pradipta Kumar Bisoi, Member (Personnel), Shri Udai Krishna, Member (Banking), Shri Salim Haque, Member (Technology) and Shri. Vineet Pandey, Member (PLI) & Chairman, Investment Board. The national headquarters are at Delhi and functions from Dak Bhavan located at the junction of Parliament Street and Ashoka Road.

The total revenue earned including remuneration for Savings Bank & Savings Certificate work during the year 2016-17 was 11,511.00  crores and the amount received from other Ministries/ Departments as Agency charges (recoveries) was 730.90 crores and expenditure is 24,211.85  crores during 2016–2017 against the previous year expenditure of 19,654.67  crores. The increase was mainly due to payment of increased pay & allowances consequent upon implementation of 7th pay commission recommendations, leave encashment during LTC, cost of materials, oil, diesel, revision of service tax on government buildings etc.

Lack of proper investment in infrastructure and technology is the reason for such low revenue. The present top management has already started investing in the latest technology to improve the infrastructure. Quality of service is being improved and new products are being offered to meet the competition.

The field services are managed by Postal Circles—generally conforming to each State—except for the North Eastern States, India has been divided into 22 postal circles, each circle headed by a Chief Postmaster General. Each Circle is further divided into Regions comprising field units, called Divisions, headed by a Postmaster General. Further divided into divisions headed by SSPOs & SPOs. further divisions are divided into Sub Divisions Headed by ASPs & IPS. Other functional units like Circle Stamp Depots, Postal Stores Depots, and Mail Motor Service may exist in the Circles and Regions.

Besides the 23 circles, there is a special Circle called the Base Circle to cater to the postal services of the Armed Forces of India. Army Postal Services (APS) is a unique arrangement to take care of the postal requirement of soldiers posted across the country. Department of Posts personnel is commissioned into the army to take care of APS. The Base Circle is headed by an Additional Director General, Army Postal Service, holding a Major general.<ref> Cheap Eggs Over Animal Welfare

The DoP is governed by the Indian Post Office Acts, 1898.
Other than the traditional postage service to keep up with the age, many new services have been introduced by the department:
e-Post - Delivery of email through postman where email service is not available
e-BillPost - Convenient way to pay bills under one roof
Postal Life insurance
International money transfers
Mutual funds
Banking

List Of Ministers

List of Ministers of State

References

Communications and Information Technology
India
 
National Informatics Centre